Brisbane Road, originally known as Osborne Road, is a football stadium in Brisbane Road, Leyton, East London, England.  It has been the home ground of Leyton Orient since 1937, before which it was the home of amateur football team Leyton F.C., who moved to the Hare and Hounds ground. Since 2022 it has also been home to Tottenham Hotspur Women. The highest attendance at the ground was 34,345 for the visit of West Ham United in the 1964 FA Cup. It has hosted a number of England U-16 and England women's team matches. It hosted the 2007–08 FA Women's Premier League Cup final. It was also home of the Tottenham Hotspur Reserves. In 2012 Brisbane Road hosted the final of the inaugural NextGen series, a competition for the academy sides of elite clubs.

History
Brisbane Road has seen several developments in its history, but due to the second world war the first major improvement was the levelling of a grass bank and crash barrier installation in 1949. The terracing behind the goals was improved again in 1952, 1959 and 1960. In 1956 a small seated stand was dismantled and replaced with a stand from the decrepit Mitcham Stadium, which held 2,600 fans. In 1962, with Leyton Orient gaining promotion to the First Division, another wing was added to the main stand making the seating total 3,500. In 1978 the West Stand was converted into all-seating. In 1996 the terracing at the southern end of the ground was demolished, and used as a car park while Lottery funding to build a stand was (unsuccessfully) sought. The South Stand was eventually built in 1999, and was renamed The Tommy Johnston Stand on 5 September 2008.

The ground is currently called the Breyer Group stadium for sponsorship reasons. In the past it was named after Leyton Orient's chairman at the time Barry Hearn's sports promotion company, Matchroom Sport, prior to which it was officially the Leyton Stadium, though fans still refer to it as Brisbane Road. The club registered an interest into moving into the Olympic Stadium following the 2012 Olympics, as the original plan was for this to have a capacity of about 25,000; however, the club's average attendance of about 5,000 meant that this was not a viable move. 
The eventual bids from both West Ham United and Tottenham Hotspur to move into the stadium, with capacity nearer 60,000, effectively ended Orient's interest. Brisbane Road is in very close proximity to both the Olympic Park and also Hackney Marshes.
On 6 May 2012, Brisbane Road hosted a Super League rugby league game between London Broncos and Bradford Bulls due to works on the Broncos' home stadium Twickenham Stoop, with Bradford winning 22–29.

Stands

Justin Edinburgh Stand
Capacity: 2,918

The Justin Edinburgh Stand is the new main stand at Brisbane Road and currently seats home supporters only. It has a capacity of 2,918, with 23 disabled supporters and their helpers. The letters L O F C are marked out amongst the seats in black. It also houses the club's administrative offices, and the club shop and main ticket office are at the back of this stand. There is also a row of executive seating (the Directors' Balcony) above the main seating which overhangs the rest of the stand, and the Olympic Suite which offers corporate hospitality. This stand also has premium seating (with its own bar) in its centre, known as the Gallery. It has two refreshment outlets at either end underneath the stand and it is accessed by turnstiles at either end via Oliver Road, or via the main reception for Gallery members and Olympic Suite diners.

The players' changing rooms are also located underneath this stand and players emerge from the tunnel here. The dugouts are located at the front of the stand, having been moved from the opposite East Stand from the start of the 2006–07 season.

The stand was officially renamed from the West Stand to the Justin Edinburgh Stand during Leyton Orient's match against Newport County on 25 January 2020, in memory of the club's recently deceased manager.

East Stand
Capacity: 3,636

The East Stand, previously used as the main stand, is the oldest current stand at Brisbane Road. The club bought it from Mitcham Stadium in 1955 to replace the small existing stand, which could hold 500 people. The East Stand initially provided covered seating for 2,600 spectators, and was expanded to 3,500 in 1962.

The East Stand, which at the time included the club's offices and dressing rooms, then remained largely unaltered until 1999, when the narrow section of terracing at the front of the structure was made all-seater.

Today the stand is used by both home and away supporters; when an away team is allocated the entire stand for safety or other reasons, Orient fans in the North half of the stand are required to move elsewhere to accommodate the extra away fans. The capacity of the Northern end of this stand is 2,133 and the Southern end is 1,459. There are also executive seats in the middle of the stand (the old directors' box, now known as the Wyvern Suite) but these are not ordinarily used by any supporters.

East Stand North: 2,133 with 15 disabled supporters and their helpers
East Stand South (away): 1,459 with seven disabled supporters and their helpers

The Qualiteach Community Stand
Capacity: 1,381

The North Stand was completed for the start of the 2007–08 season and is currently used as a family stand. It replaces a former open terrace, has a capacity of 1,351 with provision for 15 disabled supporters and their helpers, and has the letters L O F C marked into the seats in black. Access to this stand is by turnstiles at each end of the stand and there are two refreshment outlets located underneath the stand.

The stand was sponsored by the CEO of Baskin Robbins, Nigel Travis, between 2012 and 2019. Travis, a lifelong Orient fan, purchased the club itself in 2017. Since the beginning of the 2019/20 Season the stand has been sponsored by Qualiteach, an education recruitment consultancy.

Tommy Johnston South Stand
Capacity: 1,336

This stand was built in 1999 and was formerly called the South Stand. It was renamed the 'Tommy Johnston Stand' in 2008 in memory of Leyton Orient's record goalscorer Tommy Johnston, but is currently referred to by the club as the Tommy Johnston South Stand. It is currently for home supporters only and has a capacity of 1,336. It has a refreshment outlet and a bar underneath the stand and is accessed through turnstiles from Buckingham Road. It has the word ORIENT marked into the seats in white. A large block of flats backs on to the stand.

Internationals

Men's football

Women's football

References

External links

Brisbane Road on leytonorient.com
Picture Gallery Brisbane Road on londonfootballguide.com
Stadium pictures at StadiumDB.com

Football venues in London
Leyton Orient F.C.
Tottenham Hotspur F.C.
Sports venues completed in 1937
English Football League venues
1937 establishments in England
Women's Super League venues